The 2018 Overton's 225 was the 11th stock car race of the 2018 NASCAR Camping World Truck Series season and the 10th iteration of the event. The race was held on Friday, June 29, 2018, in Joliet, Illinois at Chicagoland Speedway, a  permanent D-shaped oval. The race took the scheduled 150 laps to complete. At race's end, a hard-charging Brett Moffitt, driving for Hattori Racing Enterprises would pass the fuel-ailing John Hunter Nemechek of NEMCO Motorsports on the final lap to take Moffitt's 4th career win in the NASCAR Camping World Truck Series and his 3rd of the season. To fill out the podium, Ben Rhodes of ThorSport Racing and Johnny Sauter of GMS Racing would finish 2nd and 3rd, respectively.

Background 

Chicagoland Speedway is a 1.5 miles (2.4 km) tri-oval speedway in Joliet, Illinois, southwest of Chicago. The speedway opened in 2001 and currently hosts NASCAR races. Until 2011, the speedway also hosted the IndyCar Series, recording numerous close finishes, including the closest finish in IndyCar history. The speedway is owned and operated by International Speedway Corporation and is located adjacent to Route 66 Raceway.

Entry list 

*Withdrew drew to the team's transporter breaking down while traveling to the track.

Practice

First practice 
The first practice would occur on Thursday, June 28, at 4:30 PM CST.

Second and final practice 
The second and final practice would occur on Thursday, June 28, at 6:35 PM CST.

Qualifying 
Qualifying would take place on Friday, May 11, at 4:05 PM CST. Since Chicagoland Speedway is at least 1.5 miles (2.4 km), the qualifying system was a single car, single lap, two round system where in the first round, everyone would set a time to determine positions 13-32. Then, the fastest 12 qualifiers would move on to the second round to determine positions 1-12.

No drivers would fail to qualify.

Race results 
Stage 1 Laps: 35 

Stage 2 Laps: 35 

Stage 3 Laps: 80

References 

2018 NASCAR Camping World Truck Series
NASCAR races at Chicagoland Speedway
June 2018 sports events in the United States
2018 in sports in Illinois